Peter William Gregory Tom, CBE (born 1940, Cornwall) is a British businessman. He is Chairman of Leicester Tigers.

A former group chairman and chief executive of Aggregate Industries, he made 130 appearances for Leicester Tigers as a lock forward between 1963 and 1968. He was awarded the CBE in 2006 for services to business and sport in the Midlands. He is now Executive Chairman of Breedon Aggregates.

References

External links
 Profile

British businesspeople
1940 births
Living people
Commanders of the Order of the British Empire
Leicester Tigers players
Cornish rugby union players